"Animal Army" is a song by English rock band Babylon Zoo, released in April 1996 as the second single from their first album The Boy with the X-Ray Eyes and the follow-up to the band's UK chart-topping debut single "Spaceman". It was unable to duplicate the success of its predecessor, reaching number 17 on the UK Singles Chart and falling off the chart after a further week in the top 40. In Australia, "Animal Army" peaked at number 59 in June 1996 and spent six weeks on the ARIA Singles Chart. In Hungary, the single peaked at number 10.

Reception
The Daily Telegraph called the song a "surging, riff-heavy monster" that "could well give [Babylon Zoo] another number one". Select were critical, writing: "No amount of nudity, drugs or free stuff would help make this low-rent gothic mush any better." Sonic Youth's Lee Ranaldo, a guest reviewer in Select, said that the track "isn't nearly as good as ['Spaceman']."

Track listings
UK CD single
 "Animal Army" (7-inch edit) – 3:58
 "Animal Army" (Arthur Plays with Animals) – 10:47
 "Animal Army" (Babylon Bass mix) – 6:54
 "Animal Army" (Arthur Dubs with Animals) – 10:58

UK 12-inch single
A1. "Animal Army" (Arthur Plays with Animals) – 10:47
B1. "Animal Army" (Kiss mix—remixed by Sunrise) – 7:04
B2. "Animal Army" (Capital mix—touched by the Zupervarians) – 3:47

UK cassette single
 "Animal Army" (7-inch edit) – 3:58
 "Animal Army" (Arthur Plays with Animals) – 10:47

European CD single
 "Animal Army" (7-inch edit) – 3:58
 "Animal Army" (Babylon Bass mix) – 6:54

Australian CD single
 "Animal Army" (7-inch edit) – 4:01
 "Animal Army" (Arthur Plays with Animals) – 10:49
 "Animal Army" (Babylon Bass mix) – 6:55

Charts

Release history

References

1996 singles
1996 songs
Babylon Zoo songs
EMI Records singles